Old York may refer to:
See York for "the old part of York" or "the city that New York is named after"
York, Ontario, a recently dissolved municipality in Ontario in Canada
York, Upper Canada, the name of Old Toronto in Canada between 1793 and 1834
Old York Cellars, a winery in New Jersey
Old York Road, built in the 18th century to connect Philadelphia, Pennsylvania with New York City